Victor Collins may refer to:

Victor Collins, Baron Stonham (1903–1971), British politician
Victor Collins (General Hospital), a fictional character in the U.S. TV soap opera General Hospital